Georgi Dimitrov (1 May 1931 – 16 March 1978) was a Bulgarian footballer who played as a forward. Between 1953 and 1958, Dimitrov gained 30 caps for the Bulgaria national team and scored seven goals. He competed in the men's tournament at the 1956 Summer Olympics.

He died in a plane crash at the age of 46 in 1978.

Honours

Club
CSKA Sofia
Bulgarian League (5): 1955, 1956, 1957, 1958, 1958–59
Bulgarian Cup: 1955

International
Bulgaria
Olympic Bronze Medal: 1956

References

External links
Player Profile at fccska.com

1931 births
1978 deaths
Bulgarian footballers
Bulgaria international footballers
Olympic footballers of Bulgaria
Footballers at the 1956 Summer Olympics
Olympic bronze medalists for Bulgaria
Olympic medalists in football
Medalists at the 1956 Summer Olympics
FC Chernomorets Burgas players
PFC Cherno More Varna players
PFC CSKA Sofia players
First Professional Football League (Bulgaria) players
Association football forwards
Bulgarian football managers
PFC Cherno More Varna managers
Sportspeople from Burgas
Victims of aviation accidents or incidents in 1978
Victims of aviation accidents or incidents in Bulgaria